Duke of Clarence and Avondale was a title awarded to a prince of the British royal family; the creation was in the Peerage of the United Kingdom.

'Clarence' is believed to refer to Clare in Suffolk; 'Avondale' refers to the valley of the Avon Water in Scotland.

Whilst there had previously been several creations of Dukes of Clarence (and one Duke of Clarence and St Andrews), the sole creation of a dukedom of Clarence and Avondale was for Prince Albert Victor, the eldest son of the Prince of Wales (later King Edward VII). This was the last royal dukedom to be created with two territorial designations.

The Duke died of pneumonia in 1892 before his planned marriage so the title became extinct. He is buried in the Albert Memorial Chapel adjoining St George's Chapel, Windsor, beneath an Art Nouveau memorial designed by Sir Alfred Gilbert.

Duke of Clarence and Avondale (1890)

| Prince Albert VictorHouse of Saxe-Coburg and Gotha1890–1892also: Earl of Athlone (1890)
| 
| 8 January 1864Frogmore Houseson of King Edward VII and Queen Alexandra
| Never married
| 14 January 1892Sandringham House, Sandringhamaged 28

|}

Family tree

References

Extinct dukedoms in the Peerage of the United Kingdom
Noble titles created in 1890
Peerages created for eldest sons of peers